The 1987–88 I-Divisioona season was the 14th season of the I-Divisioona, the second level of Finnish ice hockey. 12 teams participated in the league, and HPK Hämeenlinna won the championship. HPK Hämeenlinna, SaiPa Lappeenranta, and Kiekko-Reipas Lahti qualified for the promotion/relegation round of the SM-liiga.

Regular season

External links
 Season on hockeyarchives.info

2
Fin
I-Divisioona seasons